Conradia doliaris is a species of small sea snail or micromollusc, a marine gastropod mollusc in the family Conradiidae.

Description
(Original description by Arthur Adams) The height of the shell attains 2.5 mm. The dirty white shell has a turbinate shape with 4½ whorls and a profound umbilicus. The very thin shell contains distant transverse ridges, and the interstices are neatly cancellated. The aperture is nearly circular, and the sutures are deeply channeled. The thin lip is arcuated.

Distribution
This marine species occurs off Japan.

References

 Higo, S., Callomon, P. & Goto, Y. (1999) Catalogue and Bibliography of the Marine Shell-Bearing Mollusca of Japan. Elle Scientific Publications, Yao, Japan, 749 pp.

External links
 To World Register of Marine Species
 

doliaris
Gastropods described in 1863